Pelkha is a village that lies 10 km north-west of Shamli in the district of Shamli in the state of Uttar Pradesh, India.

Gallery

External links 

Villages in Shamli district